Gabrielle Caschili (born 14 July 2003) is a Dutch professional footballer who plays as a midfielder for Eredivisie club PEC Zwolle and the Netherlands national under-19 team.

References

2003 births
Living people
Dutch footballers
Association football midfielders
PEC Zwolle players
Eredivisie players
Netherlands youth international footballers